Albu Shelug (also Romanized as Ālbū Shelūg; also known as Abū Chalāk, Abū Shalūk, and Abū Sholūg) is a village in Jaffal Rural District, in the Central District of Shadegan County, Khuzestan Province, Iran. At the 2006 census, its population was 308, in 40 families.

References 

Populated places in Shadegan County